Sanjar Bazar Taradan (also Romanized as Sanjar Bāzār Tarādān; also known as Dalvash Bāzār and Sanjar Bāzār) is a village in Bahu Kalat Rural District, Dashtiari District, Chabahar County, Sistan and Baluchestan Province, Iran. At the 2006 census, its population was 250, in 46 families.

References 

Populated places in Chabahar County